In My World may refer to:

 "In My World" (Anthrax song)
 "In My World", a 2017 song from the album Buckingham McVie
 In My World (Matthewdavid album)
 In My World (Nina Hagen album)
 In My World (V Capri album)